The 1998 season was Santos Futebol Clube's eighty-sixth in existence and the club's third-ninth consecutive season in the top flight of Brazilian football.

Players

Squad

Source: Acervo Santista

Statistics

Appearances and goals

Source: Match reports in Competitive matches

Goalscorers

Source: Match reports in Competitive matches

Transfers

In

Out

Friendlies

Competitions

Campeonato Brasileiro

Results summary

First stage

Matches

Quarter-finals

Semi-finals

Copa do Brasil

First round

Second round

Third round

Quarter-finals

Semi-finals

Campeonato Paulista

Second stage

Group 4

Matches

Torneiro Rio-São Paulo

Group stage

Matches

Knockout stage

Semi-finals

Copa CONMEBOL

Round of 16

Quarter-finals

Semi-finals

Finals

References

Santos FC seasons
Brazilian football clubs 1998 season